Casing may refer to an enclosing shell, tube, or surrounding material. It may also refer to:

 Cartridge (firearms), shell enclosing the explosive propellant in ammunition
 Casing (borehole), metal tube used during the drilling of a well
 Casing (molding), decorative molding surrounding door or window openings
 Casing (sausage), thin covering holding the food contents of sausage
 Casing (submarine), platform attached to the upper side of a submersible vehicle
 Computer case, the enclosure that contains most of the components of a computer
 Letter case, the distinction between upper and lowercase letters in typography
 Surreptitious reconnaissance, especially to aid a robbery

See also
 
 
 Cas (disambiguation), French for "case"
 Case (disambiguation)
 Casting (disambiguation)
 Cover (disambiguation)
 Sleeve (disambiguation)
 KaSing, or Raymond Tsang, (born 1995) Hong Kong League of Legends player